The Billboard Adult Top 40 chart ranks the most popular songs on Adult Top 40 radio stations in the United States, based on airplay detections as measured by Nielsen BDS and published weekly by Billboard. These are the songs which reached number one on the Adult Top 40 chart during the 2010s.

Chart history

See also
2010s in music
List of artists who reached number one on the U.S. Adult Top 40 chart

References

External links
 Current Billboard Adult Pop Songs chart

United States Adult Top 40
Lists of number-one songs in the United States
2010s in American music